Rozivka is an urban-type settlement and was the administrative center of  Rozivka Raion of Zaporizhzhia Oblast in Ukraine until the raion was dissolved in 2020. It is located close to the source of the Karatysh, a right tributary of the Berda. Its population is  In the 2022 Russian invasion of Ukraine, it has been occupied by Russian-allied forces.

Economy

Transportation

The settlement is on Highway H08 connecting Zaporizhzhia and Mariupol.

Rozivka railway station has connections to Zaporizhzhia, Volnovakha, and Berdiansk. There is passenger traffic through the station.

References

Urban-type settlements in Polohy Raion